Sofiène Hidoussi (born 23 July 1970) is a Tunisian football manager.

References

1970 births
Living people
Tunisian football managers
JS Kairouan managers
Olympique Béja managers
ES Beni-Khalled managers
AS Gabès managers
Stade Tunisien managers
LPS Tozeur managers
US Ben Guerdane managers
Club Athlétique Bizertin managers
JS Kabylie managers
Tunisian expatriate football managers
Expatriate football managers in Algeria
Tunisian expatriate sportspeople in Algeria